The 1966 Pittsburgh Steelers season was the team's 34th in the National Football League.

Roster

Regular season

Schedule

Game summaries

Week 1 (Sunday September 11, 1966): New York Giants 

at Pitt Stadium, Pittsburgh, Pennsylvania

 Game time: 
 Game weather: 
 Game attendance: 37,693
 Referee: 
 TV announcers:

Scoring Drives:

 New York Giants – Jones 75 pass from Morrall (Gogolak kick)0–7
 Pittsburgh – Ballman 9 pass from Nelsen (Clark kick)7–7
 New York Giants – Crespino 19 pass from Morrall (Gogolak kick)7–14
 Pittsburgh – Asbury 6 run (Clark kick)14–14
 New York Giants – FG Gogolak 26 14–17
 Pittsburgh – Simmons 21 pass from Nelsen (Clark kick)21–17
 Pittsburgh – FG Clark 25 24–17
 Pittsburgh – Hilton 31 pass from Nelsen (Clark kick)31–17
 New York Giants – FG Gogolak 14 31–20
 New York Giants – Jones 98 pass from Morrall (Gogolak kick)31–27
 New York Giants – W. Harris 72 fumble return (Gogolak kick)31–34
 Pittsburgh – FG Clark 41 34–34

Week 2 (Sunday September 18, 1966): Detroit Lions  

at Pitt Stadium, Pittsburgh, Pennsylvania

 Game time: 
 Game weather: 
 Game attendance: 35,473
 Referee: 
 TV announcers:

Scoring Drives:

 Pittsburgh – FG Clark 13 3–0
 Pittsburgh – Hilton 32 pass from R. Smith (Clark kick)10–0
 Detroit – FG Walker 42 10–3
 Pittsburgh – Jefferson 84 pass from R. Smith (Clark kick)17–3

Week 3 (Sunday September 25, 1966): Washington Redskins  

at Pitt Stadium, Pittsburgh, Pennsylvania

 Game time: 
 Game weather: 
 Game attendance: 37,505
 Referee: 
 TV announcers:

Scoring Drives:

 Washington – FG Gogolak 41 0–3
 Washington – FG Gogolak 47 0–6
 Washington – FG Gogolak 29 0–9
 Pittsburgh – Ballman 49 pass from R. Smith (Clark kick)7–9
 Pittsburgh – J. Bradshaw 27 interception return (Clark kick)14–9
 Pittsburgh – Ballman 79 pass from R. Smith (Clark kick)21–9
 Washington – Taylor 4 pass from Jurgensen (Gogolak kick)21–16
 Pittsburgh – FG Clark 47 24–16
 Washington – Mitchell 35 pass from Jurgensen (Gogolak kick)24–23
 Washington – Taylor 2 run (Gogolak kick)24–30
 Washington – FG Gogolak 15 24–33
 Pittsburgh – FG Clark 42 27–33

Week 4 (Sunday October 2, 1966): Washington Redskins  

at D.C. Stadium, Washington, DC

 Game time: 
 Game weather: 
 Game attendance: 47,360
 Referee: 
 TV announcers:

Scoring Drives:

 Washington – Taylor 60 pass from Jurgensen (Gogolak kick)0–7
 Washington – FG Gogolak 12 0–10
 Pittsburgh – Hoak 2 run (Clark kick)7–10
 Pittsburgh – FG Clark 25 10–10
 Washington – Mitchell 51 pass from Jurgensen (Gogolak kick)10–17
 Washington – Mitchell 70 pass from Jurgensen (Gogolak kick)10–24

Week 5 (Saturday October 8, 1966): Cleveland Browns  

at Cleveland Municipal Stadium, Cleveland, Ohio

 Game time: 
 Game weather: 
 Game attendance: 82,687
 Referee: 
 TV announcers:

Scoring Drives:

 Cleveland – Collins 23 pass from Ryan (Groza kick)0–7
 Cleveland – Collins 14 pass from Ryan (Groza kick)0–14
 Cleveland – Kelly 2 run (Groza kick)0–21
 Pittsburgh – Jefferson 23 pass from Izo (Clark kick)7–21
 Pittsburgh – FG Clark 16 10–21
 Cleveland – Kelly 10 run (kick failed)10–27
 Cleveland – Warfield 3 fumble return (Groza kick)10–34
 Cleveland – R. Smith 24 pass from Ninowski (Groza kick)10–41

Week 6 (Sunday October 16, 1966): Philadelphia Eagles  

at Pitt Stadium, Pittsburgh, Pennsylvania

 Game time: 
 Game weather: 
 Game attendance: 28,233
 Referee: 
 TV announcers:

Scoring Drives:

 Pittsburgh – Asbury 37 pass from Izo (Clark kick)7–0
 Philadelphia – Gros 11 run (Baker kick)7–7
 Pittsburgh – Asbury 11 run (Clark kick)14–7
 Philadelphia – Gros 1 run (Baker kick)14–14
 Philadelphia – Brown 9 pass from Snead (Baker kick)14–21
 Philadelphia – Goodwin 11 pass from Snead (Baker kick)14–28
 Philadelphia – FG Baker 51 14–31

Week 8 at Cowboys

Week 9 vs Browns

Week 10 (Sunday November 13, 1966): St. Louis Cardinals  

at Pitt Stadium, Pittsburgh, Pennsylvania

 Game time: 
 Game weather: 
 Game attendance: 28,552
 Referee: 
 TV announcers:

Scoring Drives:

 St. Louis – FG Bakken 37 0–3
 St. Louis – FG Bakken 17 0–6
 St. Louis – FG Bakken 12 0–9
 Pittsburgh – FG Clark 40 3–9
 Pittsburgh – Russell  14 blocked punt return (Clark kick)10–9
 Pittsburgh – FG Clark 33 13–9
 Pittsburgh – FG Clark 22 16–9
 Pittsburgh – Hilton 11 pass from R. Smith (Clark kick)23–9
 Pittsburgh – Jefferson 42 pass from Hoak30–9

Week 11 (Sunday November 20, 1966): Dallas Cowboys  

at Pitt Stadium, Pittsburgh, Pennsylvania

 Game time: 
 Game weather: 
 Game attendance: 42,185
 Referee: 
 TV announcers:

Scoring Drives:

 Dallas – Meredith 3 run (Villanueva kick)0–7
 Dallas – FG Villandueva 27 0–10
 Pittsburgh – Asbury 11 pass from R. Smith (Clark kick)7–10
 Dallas – FG Villanueva 37 7–13
 Dallas – Hayes 38 pass from Meredith (Villanueva kick)7–20

Week 12 (Sunday November 27, 1966): St. Louis Cardinals  

at Busch Memorial Stadium, St. Louis, Missouri

 Game time: 
 Game weather: 
 Game attendance: 46,099
 Referee: 
 TV announcers:

Scoring Drives:

 Pittsburgh – FG Clark 47 3–0
 St. Louis – FG Bakken 26 3–3
 St. Louis – FG Bakken 15 3–6

Week 13 (Sunday December 4, 1966): Philadelphia Eagles  

at Franklin Field, Philadelphia, Pennsylvania

 Game time: 
 Game weather: 
 Game attendance: 54,275
 Referee: 
 TV announcers:

Scoring Drives:

 Philadelphia – FG Baker 35 0–3
 Pittsburgh – Asbury 7 run (Clark kick)7–3
 Pittsburgh – FG Clark 37 10–3
 Philadelphia – Woodeshick 3 run (Baker kick)10–10
 Philadelphia – FG Baker 22 10–13
 Pittsburgh – FG Clark 32 13–13
 Pittsburgh – FG Clark 35 16–13
 Philadelphia – Woodeshick 1 run (Baker kick)16–20
 Philadelphia – Concannon 1 run (Baker kick)16–27
 Pittsburgh – Asbury 2 run (Clark kick)23–27

Week 14 (Sunday December 11, 1966): New York Giants  

at Yankee Stadium, The Bronx, New York

 Game time: 
 Game weather: 
 Game attendance: 62,658
 Referee: 
 TV announcers:

Scoring Drives:

 Pittsburgh – Safety, Lockhart stepped out of end zone 2–0
 Pittsburgh – FG Clark 12 5–0
 Pittsburgh – Bullocks 13 pass from Nelsen (Clark kick)12–0
 New York Giants – Thomas 1 pass from Kennedy (Gogolak kick)12–7
 Pittsburgh – Leftridge 2 run (Clark kick)19–7
 New York Giants – Jones 82 pass from Kennedy (Gogolak kick)19–14
 Pittsburgh – Asbury 1 run (Clark kick)26–14
 Pittsburgh – Asbury 1 run (Clark kick)33–14
 New York Giants – Thomas 5 pass from Kennedy (Gogolak kick)33–21
 Pittsburgh – Butler  66 pass from Nelsen (Clark kick)40–21
 Pittsburgh – Leftridge 2 run (Russell pass from Hoak)47–21
 New York Giants – Crespino 16 pass from Kennedy (Gogolak kick)47–28

Week 15 (Sunday December 18, 1966): Atlanta Falcons  

at Atlanta Stadium, Atlanta, Georgia

 Game time: 
 Game weather: 
 Game attendance: 56,229
 Referee: 
 TV announcers:

Scoring Drives:

 Pittsburgh – FG Clark 22 3–0
 Pittsburgh – FG Clark 19 6–0
 Pittsburgh – Ballman 12 pass from Nelsen (Clark kick)13–0
 Pittsburgh – Bullocks 13 run (Clark kick)20–0
 Atlanta – Coffey 1 run (Kirouac kick)20–7
 Pittsburgh – Butler  1 run (run failed)26–7
 Pittsburgh – FG Clark 21 29–7
 Atlanta – Ridlehuber 53 pass from Johnson (Kirouac kick)29–14
 Pittsburgh – Butler  1 run (Clark kick)36–14
 Pittsburgh – Jefferson 68 pass from Nelsen (Clark kick)43–14
 Pittsburgh – Thomas 23 fumble return (Clark kick)50–14
 Atlanta – Ridlehuber 19 pass form Johnson (Kirouac kick)50–21
 Pittsburgh – Asbury 2 run (Clark kick)57–21
 Atlanta – Anderson 62 pass from Claridge (kick failed)57–27
 Atlanta – Anderson 12 pass from Claridge (kick failed)57–33

Standings

References

External links
 1966 Pittsburgh Steelers season at Profootballreference.com 
 1966 Pittsburgh Steelers season statistics at jt-sw.com 

Pittsburgh Steelers seasons
Pittsburgh Steelers
Pittsburgh Steel